The Bell 101 dataset or Bell 101 modem was the first commercial modem for computers, released by AT&T Corporation in 1958 for use by SAGE and in 1959 made commercial shortly after AT&T's Bell Labs announced their 110 baud modulation frequencies. The Bell 101 modem allowed digital data to be transmitted over regular unconditioned telephone lines at a speed of 110 bits per second.

Bell 101 modems are no longer in use and were quickly replaced by its successor the Bell 103 modem. SAGE modems were described by AT&T's Bell Labs as conforming to the Bell 101 dataset standard.

The Bell 101 modems were the first commercial equipment to use ASCII, which was called "four row", as opposed to the Baudot "three row" 6-bit/character code which was predominant from 1908 to 1962, prior to the rise of EBCDIC.

See also
 List of device bandwidths
 Bell 202 modem

References

Further reading
 
 
 

Modems
AT&T
Computer-related introductions in 1959
Telecommunications-related introductions in 1959